This is a list of Iranian League winning futsal managers.

By year

Province championship

Premier league

Super league

Managers with multiple titles

See also
 List of Iranian football league winning managers
 Iranian Futsal Super League
 List of Iranian Futsal champions
 List of Iranian club futsal top goal scorers

References 

futsal league
Iranian Futsal Super League